Russell, also Rosel, Rousel, Russel or Rossell. The origin of the name has historically been subject to disagreement, with two distinct origins proposed. Early genealogists traced the Russel/Russell family of Kingston Russel from Anglo-Norman landholders bearing the toponymic surname 'de Rosel' or 'du Rozel', deriving from Rosel, Calvados, Normandy (not, as has also been claimed, Le Rozel, Manche). However, J. Horace Round observed that these flawed pedigrees erroneously linked toponymic-bearing men with unrelated men who instead bore the Anglo-Norman nickname rus[s]el (represented in contemporary Latin documents as Rosellus), given men with red hair. This nickname was a diminutive of the Norman-French rus (Old French ros, Modern French roux), meaning 'red', and was also an archaic name for the red fox, which in turn borrowed from Old Norse rossel, "red-haired, from Old Norse ros "red hair color" and the suffix -el. Round concluded "there is no reason to suppose that the surname Russell was territorial at all," and surname dictionaries have preferred to derive the surname from the nickname. Dictionaries also state that the English name Rufus originally meant "red haired".  

People with surname Russell include:

A 
 Aaron Russell (born 1993), American volleyball player
 Adam Russell (disambiguation), several people
 Addie Jenne Russell, American politician
 Addison Russell (born 1994), American baseball player
 Addison Peale Russell (1826–1912), American author
 Ajani Russell, American skateboarder and actress
 Albert Russell (director) (1890–1929), American filmmaker
 Albert Russell, Lord Russell (1884–1975), Scottish politician
 Alec Russell, English journalist
 Alex Russell (disambiguation), several people
 Alexander Russell (disambiguation), several people
 Alexei Maxim Russell (born 1976), Canadian writer
 Alfred Russell (disambiguation), several people
 Alice Russell (singer) (born 1975), English singer
 Alice B. Russell (1892–1984), American actress
 Allan Russell (born 1980), Scottish footballer
 Allen Russell (1893–1972), American baseball player
 Alys Russell (1867–1951), American-born English Quaker relief organiser
 Andre Russell (born 1988), Jamaican cricketer
 Andrea Russell, American chemist and professor 
 Andrew Russell (disambiguation), several people
 Andy Russell (disambiguation), several people
 Angela Russell (disambiguation), several people
 Anna Russell (1911–2006), English–Canadian singer and comedian
 Anna Russell (botanist) (1807–1876), British botanist
 Anna Russell, Duchess of Bedford (1783–1857), Lady of the Bedchamber to Queen Victoria
 Anne Russell (judge) (born 1940), Canadian judge
 Anne Russell (artist), (1781–1857), English pastellist
 Anne Russell, Countess of Warwick (1548 or 1549–1604), Lady-in-waiting to Queen Elizabeth I
 Anthony Russell (disambiguation), several people
 Archibald Russell (disambiguation), several people
 Arthur Russell (disambiguation), several people
 Austin Lee Russell (born 1982), American television personality and businessman known as Chumlee

B 
 Barry Russell, Australian rugby league footballer active in the 1950s
 Barry Russell (Cronulla), Australian rugby league footballer active 1985–1991
 Belinda Russell (born c.1978), Australian newsreader
 Benjamin Russell (disambiguation), several people
 Bertrand Russell (1872–1970), British polymath
 Betsy Russell (born 1963), American actress
 Bibi Russell (born 1950), Bangladeshi model and fashion designer
 Bill Russell (disambiguation), also Billy Russell, several people
 Bing Russell (1926–2003), American actor
 Bob Russell (disambiguation), also Bobby Russell, several people
 Bourn Russell (1794–1880), British/Australian mariner, pastoralist, businessman and politician
 Brenda Russell (born 1949), American musician
 Brian Russell (born 1978), American football player
 Brian Russell (priest) (born 1950), British Anglican priest
 Bruce Russell (disambiguation), several people
 Bryan Russell (born 1981), American record producer
 Bryon Russell (born 1970), American basketball player
 Byron Russell (1884–1963), Irish actor

C 
 Calvin Russell (American football)  (born 1983), American football player
 Calvin Russell (musician) (1948–2011), American singer-songwriter and guitarist
 Cam Russell (born 1969), Canadian hockey player
 Cameron Russell (born 1987), American fashion model
 Campy Russell (born 1952), American basketball player
 Carl Parcher Russell (born 1984), American historian and ecologist
 Carl Ray Russell (born 1957), American politician
 Caroline Russell (born 1962), British politician
 Carolyn Russell  (born 1974), Canadian squash player
 Catherine Russell (disambiguation), several people
 Cazzie Russell (born 1944), American basketball player
 Chapelle Russell (born 1997), American football player
 Charles Russell (disambiguation), several people
 Charlie Russell (disambiguation), several people
 Chris Russell  (born 1989), English cricketer
 Chris J. Russell (born 1980), American jockey
 Christine Russell (born 1945), British politician
 Christopher T. Russell (born 1943), American physicist
 Chuck Russell (born 1958), American film director, producer, screenwriter and actor
 Clarence D. Russell (1895–1963), American cartoonist
 Clarence W. Russell (died 1919), American college sports coach
 Clive Russell (born 1945), Scottish actor
 Colin Russell (disambiguation), several people
 Connie Russell (1923–1990), American singer and actress
 Conrad Russell (letter writer) (1878–1947), English letter writer
 Conrad Russell, 5th Earl Russell (1937–2004), British historian and politician
 Corinne Russell (born 1963), English model
 Craig Russell (disambiguation), several people

D 
 D'Angelo Russell (born 1996), American basketball player
 Dale Russell (1937–2019), American-Canadian geologist and palaeontologist
 Damien Russell (born 1970), American football player
 Daniel Russell (disambiguation), also Dan or Danny Russell, several people
 Danielle Rose Russell (born 1999), American actress
 Darrell Russell (disambiguation), several people
 David Russell (disambiguation), also Dave Russell, several people
 Davy Russell (born 1979), Irish jockey
 Dean Russell (born 1976), American politician
 Diana Russell (disambiguation), several people
 Donald Russell (disambiguation), several people
 Dontavius Russell (born 1995), American football player
 Dora Russell (1894–1986), British author, a feminist and socialist campaigner
 Doug Russell (American football) (1911–1995), American football player
 Doug Russell (swimmer) (born 1946), American swimmer
 Dudley Russell (1896–1978), British Indian Army general in World War II
 Dwayne Russell (born 1965), Australian rules footballer and commentator

E 
 Ebenezer Russell (1747–1836), New York politician
 Edith Finch Russell (1900–1978), American writer and biographer
 Edward Russell (disambiguation), several people
 Elam W. Russell Sr. (1828–1897), American politician and Missouri state representative
 Elizabeth Russell (disambiguation), several people
 Eric Russell (disambiguation), several people
 Erica Russell (born 1951), New Zealand-born film animator
 Erk Russell (1926–2006), American athlete and coach
 Ethan Russell (born 1945), American photographer and author
 Evangeline Russell (1902–1966), American actress

F 
 Fatts Russell (born 1988), American basketball player
 Findlay E. Russell (1919–2011), American physician and toxicologist
 Finn Russell (born 1992), Scottish rugby union player
 Francis Russell (disambiguation), several people
 Frank Russell (disambiguation), several people
 Frederick Russell (disambiguation), several people

G 
 Gail Russell (1924–1961), American actress
 Gareth Russell (author), British historian and author
 Gareth Russell (musician), Scottish musician
 Gary Russell (disambiguation), several people
 Geoffrey Russell, 4th Baron Ampthill (1921–2011), British peer
 George Russell (racing driver) (born 1998)
 Gerald Russell (1928–2018), British psychiatrist
 Gerald F. Russell (1916–2014), United States Marine Corps officer
 Gerard Russell (diplomat), British diplomat and writer
 Gerard Russell (politician) (1620–1682), English politician
 Gilbert Russell (disambiguation), several people
 Gordon Russell (disambiguation), several people
 Graham Russell (born 1950), English musician
 Grayson Russell (born 1989), American actor
 Green Pinckney Russell (1861–1939), American school administrator and teacher
 Guy Russell (1898–1977), Royal Navy admiral
 Guy Russell (footballer) (born 1967), English football player and manager

H 
 Harold Russell (1914–2002), American World War II veteran, amputee, and actor
 Harold Russell (politician) (1871–1938), New Zealand farmer, sportsman, and politician
 Harry Russell (disambiguation), several people
 Hastings Russell, 12th Duke of Bedford (1888–1953), British peer
 Henry Russell (disambiguation), several people
 Herbrand Russell, 11th Duke of Bedford (1858–1940), British politician and peer
 Honey Russell (1902–1973), American basketball player and coach

I 
 Ian Russell (disambiguation), several people
 Ivan Russell (born 1952), Australian rules footballer

J 
 Jack Russell (disambiguation), several people
 JaMarcus Russell (born 1985), American football player
 James Russell (disambiguation) (includes Jim)
 Jane Russell (1921–2011), American actress
 Jason Russell (born 1978), American director and human rights activist
 Jay Russell (born 1960), American filmmaker
 Jay Russell (writer) (born 1961), American author
 Jeannie Russell (born 1950), American actress
 Jeff Russell (born 1961), American baseball player and manager
 Jeffrey Burton Russell (born 1934), American historian and religious scholar
 Jenna Russell (born 1967), English actress and singer
 Jennifer Russell (born 1978), American tennis player
 Jennifer Russell (physician), Canadian physician and health official
 Jennifer Russell (lacrosse), American lacrosse player
 Jeremiah Russell (1786–1867), American politician from New York
 Jeremiah Russell (Minnesota politician) (1809–1885), American territorial legislator
 Jesse Russell (born 1948), American inventor
 Jimmy Russell (1878–1925), Australian rules footballer
 Jimmy Russell (rugby league), British rugby league footballer
 J. J. Russell (born 1998), American football player
 Jo Russell (born 1970), British radio presenter
 Joe Russell (disambiguation), several people
 John Russell (disambiguation), several people
 Johnny Russell (disambiguation), several people
 Jon Russell (disambiguation), several people
 Jonathan Russell (disambiguation), several people
 Jordan Russell (born 1986), Australian rules footballer
 Joseph Russell (disambiguation), several people

K 
 Kane Russell (born 1992), New Zealand field hockey player
 Karen Russell (born 1981), American author
 Kate Russell (disambiguation), several people
 Katherine Russell (disambiguation), several people
 Kathleen Russell (athlete) (1927–1969), Jamaican sprinter
 Kathleen Russell (swimmer) (1912–1992), South African swimmer
 Keith Russell (disambiguation), several people
 KeiVarae Russell (born 1993), American football player
 Ken Russell (1927–2011), British film director
 Kenneth Russell (disambiguation), several people
 Kent Russell, American author
 Keri Russell (born 1976), American actress
 Kevin Russell (footballer) (born 1966), English footballer
 Kevin Russell (musician) (born 1964), German singer
 Kimberly Russell (born 1964), American actress
 Kris Russell (born 1987), Canadian ice hockey player
 Kurt Russell (born 1951), American actor

L 
 Lafayette Russell (1904–1978), American football player
 Lance Russell (1926–2017), American sports broadcaster and commentator
 Larry Russell (1913–1954), American composer
 Larry Russell (bassist) (born 1950), American musician
 Lee Russell (disambiguation), several people
 Leon Russell (1942–2016), American musician and songwriter
 Leonard Russell (disambiguation), several people
 Leroy "Junior" Russell (born 1987), known as Tommy Lee Sparta, Jamaican dancehall musician
 Lewis Russell (1889–1961), American actor
 Liane Russell (1923–2019), American geneticist
 Lillian Russell (1860/1861–1922), American vaudeville actress and singer
 Lindsey Russell, English television presenter
 Lloyd Russell (1913–1968), American athlete and college sports coach
 Lucy Russell (actress) (born 1972), British actress
 Lucy Russell, Countess of Bedford (1580–1627), English patron of the arts
 Luis Russell (1902–1963), Panamanian jazz pianist
 Lynne Russell (born 1946), American journalist and author

M 
 Malinda Russell (born ), African-American cookbook writer
 Mariya Russell, American chef and Michelin star restaurateur
 Mark Russell (disambiguation), several people
 Martha M. Russell (1867–1961), American nurse in World War I
 Mary Russell (disambiguation), several people
 Marzuk Russell (born 1973),  Bangladeshi lyricist, poet, model, and actor
 Matthew Russell (disambiguation), also Matt Russell, several people
 Mercedes Russell (born 1995), American basketball player
 Michael Russell (disambiguation), several people
 Micho Russell (1915–1994), Irish musician and author
 Mickey Russell, American football player
 Mike Russell (disambiguation), several people
 Moses Russell (1888–1946), Welsh international footballer

N 
 Naomi Russell (born 1990), Australian gymnast
 Newton Russell (1927–2013), American politician
 Nicholas Russell, 6th Earl Russell (1968–2014), British politician
 Nick Russell (disambiguation), several people
 Nipsey Russell (1918–2005), American comedian

O 
 Odo Russell, 1st Baron Ampthill (1829–1884), British diplomat

P 
 P. Craig Russell (born 1951), American comic writer, artist, and illustrator
 Pat Russell (1923–2021), American community activist and politician
 Patricia Russell, Countess Russell (1910–2004), British philosopher
 Patrick Russell (disambiguation), several people
 Patti Russell (fl. 1919–1929), Australian soprano
 Paul Russell (disambiguation), several people
 Pee Wee Russell (1906–1969), American jazz musician
 Peter Russell (disambiguation), several people
 Philip Russell (disambiguation), several people
 Polly Russell, British historian

R 
 Rachel Russell, Lady Russell (–1723), English letter writer and author
 Rachel Renée Russell, American children's author
 Reb Russell (1889–1973), American baseball player
 Regan Russell (1955–2020), Canadian animal rights activist
 Richard Russell (disambiguation), several people
 Rip Russell (1915–1976), American baseball player
 Robert Russell (disambiguation), several people
 Robin Russell, 14th Duke of Bedford (1940–2003), British peer and conservationist
 Ron Russell (1926–2019), Canadian politician
 Rosalind Russell (1907–1976), American actress
 Ross Russell (footballer, born 1967) (born 1967), Trinidadian footballer
 Ross Russell (jazz), (1909–2000), American record producer
 Rusty Russell (disambiguation), several people
 Ryan Russell (ice hockey) (born 1987), Canadian hockey player
 Ryan Russell (American football) (born 1992), American football player

S 
 Sally-Anne Russell, Australian mezzo-soprano
 Sam Russell (disambiguation), several people
 Samuel Russell (disambiguation), several people
 Sara Russell (born 1966), British planetary scientist
 Sarah Rachel Russell (–1880), British criminal
 Scott Russell (disambiguation), several people
 Seán Russell (1893–1940), Irish republican
 Sean Russell (author) (born 1952), Canadian fantasy author
 Seth Russell (born 1994), American football player
 Sheila Russell (1935–2022), American politician
 Shirley Russell (artist) (1886–1985), American artist 
 Shirley Ann Russell (1935–2002), British costume designer
 Simon Russell (disambiguation), several people
 Sol Smith Russell (1848–1902), American actor
 Stephen Russell (disambiguation), several people
 Steve Russell (disambiguation), several people
 Stuart Russell (disambiguation), several people

T 
 Taylor Russell (born 1994), Canadian actress
 Ted Russell (disambiguation), several people
 Theresa Russell (born 1957), American actress
 Theodore E. Russell (born 1936), American diplomat
 Thomas Russell (disambiguation), also Tom Russell, several people
 Tim Russell (born 1947), American radio personality and voice actor
 Twan Russell (born 1974), American football player

V 
 Vaughan Russell (1890–1979), Scottish footballer

W 
 Walter Russell (1871–1963), American artist and author
 Walter B. Russell Jr. (1929–2016), American army officer and politician
 Walter Westley Russell (1867–1949), British painter and art teacher
 Welford Russell (1900–1975), Canadian composer
 William Russell (disambiguation), also Will and Willy Russell, several people
 Wriothesley Russell, 2nd Duke of Bedford (1680–1711), British noble and politician
 Wriothesley Russell, 3rd Duke of Bedford (1708–1732), British noble and peer
 Wyatt Russell (born 1986), American actor and former ice hockey player

See also
 Clan Russell
 Duke of Bedford, held by the Russell family
 Earl Russell
 Lady Russell (disambiguation)
 Lord Russell (disambiguation)
 Roussel (surname)
 Russel (disambiguation)
 Russell (given name)

References

English-language surnames